Liceo Classico Massimo d'Azeglio is a public sixth form college/senior high school (liceo classico) in Turin, Italy. It is named after the politician Massimo d'Azeglio.

History
It was established as the Collegio di Porta Nuova in 1831 and became the Regio Collegio Monviso in 1860. It was renamed to its current name in 1882.

David Ward, author of 'Primo Levi's Turin', wrote that Liceo d'Azeglio was "one of Turin's most prestigious schools".

The school is linked to the founding of Juventus F.C. as Sport-Club Juventus in late 1897 by pupils of the school; two years later, they were renamed as Foot-Ball Club Juventus.

The school held two study days in honor of alumnus Primo Levi in 2007.

Notable alumni
 Norberto Bobbio
 Giulio Einaudi
 Vittorio Foa
 Leone Ginzburg
 Gino Levi-Montalcini
 Primo Levi
 Giancarlo Pajetta
 Cesare Pavese

References

Further reading
  Brandone, Giorgio and Tiziana Cerrato. I luoghi di Levi: atti del convegno di studi su Primo Levi, Liceo classico "D'Azeglio" Torino 24-25 maggio 2007 (Volume 1 of Quaderni del Liceo "D'Azeglio"). Liceo classico statale " Massimo D'Azeglio, 2008. See profile at Google Books.

External links
 Liceo Classico d'Azeglio 

Liceo classico
Schools in Turin
1831 establishments in Italy
Educational institutions established in 1831